Teerapong Puttasukha (born 11 February 1987) is a Thai footballer who plays as a goalkeeper for Sisaket.

References

External links
 Profile at Goal

1987 births
Living people
Teerapong Puttasukha
Teerapong Puttasukha
Association football goalkeepers
Teerapong Puttasukha
Teerapong Puttasukha
Teerapong Puttasukha
Teerapong Puttasukha
Teerapong Puttasukha